The North Icelandic Jet is  a deep-reaching current that flows along the continental slope of Iceland. The North Icelandic Jet advects overflow water into the Denmark Strait and constitutes a pathway that is distinct from the East Greenland Current. It is a cold current that runs west across the top of Iceland, then southwest between Greenland and Iceland at a depth of about 600 metres (almost 2,000 feet). The North Icelandic Jet is deep and narrow (about 12 mile wide) and can carry more than a million cubic meters of water per second. It was not discovered until 2004.

References 
 Kjetil Våge, Robert S. Pickart, Michael A. Spall, Héðinn Valdimarsson, Steingrímur Jónsson, Daniel J. Torres, Svein Østerhus & Tor Eldevik, Significant role of the North Icelandic Jet in the formation of Denmark Strait overflow water, Nature Geoscience 4, 723–727 (2011) doi:10.1038/ngeo1234
  Steingrimur Jonsson and Hedinn Valdimarsson, A new path for the Denmark Strait overflow water from the Iceland, GEOPHYSICAL RESEARCH LETTERS, VOL. 31, L03305, doi:10.1029/2003GL019214
 Stefanie Semper, Kjetil Våge, Robert S. Pickart, Héðinn Valdimarsson, Daniel J. Torres & Steingrímur Jónsson, The emergence of the North Icelandic Jet and its evolution from Northeast Iceland to Denmark Strait, Journal of Physical Oceanography, 49, 2499-2521, doi:10.1175/JPO-D-19-0088.1
 North Icelandic Jet: New Ocean Current Could Change Climate Picture

Oceanography
Currents of the Arctic Ocean